In mathematical logic, the Hilbert–Bernays provability conditions, named after David Hilbert and Paul Bernays, are a set of requirements for formalized provability predicates in formal theories of arithmetic (Smith 2007:224).

These conditions are used in many proofs of Kurt Gödel's second incompleteness theorem. They are also closely related to axioms of provability logic.

The conditions 
The Hilbert–Bernays provability conditions are:

 If  proves a sentence  then  proves .
 For every sentence ,  proves 
  proves that  and  imply 

In the more concise notation of provability logic, letting  denote " proves " and  denote :

Use in proving Gödel's incompleteness theorems

The Hilbert–Bernays provability conditions, combined with the diagonal lemma, allow proving both of Gödel's incompleteness theorems shortly. Indeed the main effort of Godel's proofs lied in showing that these conditions (or equivalent ones) and the diagonal lemma hold for Peano arithmetics; once these are established the proof can be easily formalized.

Using the diagonal lemma, there is a formula  such that .

Proving Godel's first incompleteness theorem
For the first theorem only the first and third conditions are needed.

The condition that  is ω-consistent is generalized by the condition that if for every formula , if  proves  , then  proves .

Suppose T could have proven . We then would have the following theorems in :

 (by condition no. 1 and theorem 1)
But if  is consistent, this is impossible, and we are forced to conclude that  does not prove .

Now let us suppose  could have proven . We then would have the following theorems in :

 (by ω-consistency)
But if  is consistent, this is impossible, and we are forced to conclude that  does not prove .

To conclude,  can prove neither  nor .

Using Rosser's trick
Using Rosser's trick, one needs not assume that  is -consistent. This follows from the fact that for every formula ,  holds if and only if  holds.

An additional condition used is that  proves that  implies . This condition holds for every  that includes logic and very basic arithmetics (as elaborated in Rosser's trick#The Rosser sentence).

Using Rosser's trick,  is defined using Rosser's provability predicate, instead of the naive provability predicate. The first part of the proof remains unchanged, except that the provability predicate is replaced with Rosser's provability predicate there, too.

The second part of the proof no longer uses ω-consistency, and is changed to the following:

Suppose  could have proven . We then would have the following theorems in :

 (by theorem 2 and the additional condition following the definition of Rosser's provability predicate)
 (by condition no. 1 and theorem 1)
But if  is consistent, this is impossible, and we are forced to conclude that  does not prove .

The second theorem

We assume that  proves its own consistency, i.e. that:
.
For every formula :
 (by negation elimination)

It is possible to show by using condition no. 1 on the latter theorem, followed by repeated use of condition no. 3, that:

And using  proving its own consistency it follows that: 

We now use this to show that  is not consistent:
 (following  proving its own consistency, with )
 (by construction of )
 (by condition no. 1 and theorem 2)
 (by condition no. 3 and theorem 3)
 (by theorems 1 and 4)
 (by condition no. 2)
 (by theorems 5 and 6)
 (by construction of )
 (by theorems 7 and 8)
 (by condition 1 and theorem 9)

References 

 Smith, Peter (2007). An introduction to Gödel's incompleteness theorems. Cambridge University Press. 

Mathematical logic
Provability logic